Hamlet, also known as Hamlet 2000, is a 2000 American drama film written and directed by Michael Almereyda, set in contemporary New York City, and based on the Shakespeare play of the same name. Ethan Hawke plays Hamlet as a film student, Kyle MacLachlan co-stars as Uncle Claudius, with Diane Venora as Gertrude, Liev Schreiber as Laertes, Julia Stiles as Ophelia, Steve Zahn as Rosencrantz, Bill Murray as Polonius, and Sam Shepard as Hamlet's father.

In this version of Hamlet, Claudius is "king" of the Denmark Corporation, having taken over the firm by killing his brother, Hamlet's father.

This adaptation keeps the Shakespearean dialogue but presents a modern setting, with technology such as video cameras, Polaroid cameras, and surveillance bugs. For example, the ghost of Hamlet's murdered father first appears on closed-circuit TV.

Adaptations
Elsinore Castle, the seat of power of Denmark's crown in the play, is re-imagined as Hotel Elsinore, the headquarters of Denmark Corporation.
Prior to delivering the "To be, or not to be" monologue, Hamlet is seen watching a video of famed Buddhist teacher Thich Nhat Hanh explaining the principle "To be is to be with others; to be is to inter-be" a basic teaching of Hanh's "Order of Interbeing".
The "Mousetrap" play takes the form of a video art montage, edited by Hamlet himself.
Instead of a Tapestry, Polonius hides in Gertrude's closet, then Hamlet shoots him through the door. 
The character of Marcellus, one of the soldiers, is re-imagined as Marcella, Horatio's girlfriend.
The Captain in Fortinbras' army is replaced by a flight attendant on Hamlet's flight to England.
Instead of carrying around actual flowers, Ophelia carries polaroid photographs of various flowers. In the film, Ophelia is an amateur photographer.
Fortinbras' conquests are not military but corporate takeovers with the aid of his "armies" of lawyers.
As opposed to drowning in a brook, Ophelia is found to have drowned in a fountain in front of the Hotel Elsinore, surrounded by mementos of her relationship with Hamlet.
The Ghost of King Hamlet appears in Horatio's apartment, sitting in his bedroom as Marcella sleeps before Hamlet and Horatio enter it.
The first intervention of Osric is re-imagined as a fax machine in Hamlet and Horatio's apartment, delivering Laertes' message right before the duel. However, Osric does appear during the duel between Hamlet and Laertes.
Laertes does not kill Hamlet with a poisoned rapier. Instead, he shoots Hamlet with a pistol, then is shot himself. Hamlet then uses the same pistol to shoot and kill Claudius.

Cast

Ethan Hawke as Hamlet
Kyle MacLachlan as Claudius
Diane Venora as Gertrude
Sam Shepard as Ghost
Liev Schreiber as Laertes
Julia Stiles as Ophelia
Bill Murray as Polonius
Karl Geary as Horatio
Paula Malcomson as Marcella
Steve Zahn as Rosencrantz
Dechen Thurman as Guildenstern
Rome Neal as Barnardo
Jeffrey Wright as Gravedigger
Paul Bartel as Osric
Casey Affleck as Fortinbras
Robert Thurman as Priest
Tim Blake Nelson as Flight captain
Larry Fessenden as Kissing Man

Reception
Reviews of this film have been mixed.  Metacritic assigned the film a weighted average score of 70/100, based on 32 reviews from mainstream critics. 

Film critic Elvis Mitchell of The New York Times lauded it as a "vital and sharply intelligent film," while The Washington Post reviewer deemed it as a "darkly interesting distraction but not much more." The reaction to Hawke's performance as the title role is also mixed. The Los Angeles Times described him as a "superb Prince of Denmark - youthful, sensitive, passionate but with a mature grasp of the workings of human nature." New York magazine, however, thought Hawke's performance was only "middling."

See also
Romeo + Juliet - another contemporary-set Shakespearean film adaptation, which also features Diane Venora.
10 Things I Hate About You and O - contemporary adaptations of The Taming of the Shrew and Othello, respectively, both also featuring Julia Stiles.
Scotland, PA - a contemporary adaptation of Macbeth

References

External links

2000 drama films
2000 films
American drama films
2000s English-language films
Films set in New York City
Camcorder films
Films based on Hamlet
Miramax films
Modern adaptations of works by William Shakespeare
Films scored by Carter Burwell
Fratricide in fiction
American films based on plays
2000s American films